Thomassen is a patronymic family name of Scandinavian and Dutch origin. It literally means "son of Thomas", i.e., approximately corresponds to Thomson. Notable people with the name include:

Ann-Mari Thomassen (born 1964), Sámi politician
Bjørn Thomassen (born 1968), Danish anthropologist and social scientist
Carsten Thomassen (mathematician) (born 1948), Danish mathematician
Carsten Thomassen (journalist) (1969–2008), Norwegian journalist and war correspondent
Dag Ole Thomassen (born 1986), Norwegian football goalkeeper
Dan Thomassen (born 1981), Danish football defender
Einar Thomassen (born 1951), Norwegian Professor in Religious Studies
Gustav Thomassen (1862–1929), Norwegian actor and theatre director
Hedvig Mollestad Thomassen (born 1982), Norwegian jazz musician 
Ivar Thomassen (1954–2016), Norwegian folk singer, songwriter, and jazz pianist
Jacques Thomassen (born 1945), Dutch organizational theorist
Joachim Thomassen (born 1988), Norwegian football defender
Jordy Thomassen (born 1993), Dutch football striker
Kay Thomassen (born 1987), Dutch football midfielder
Knut Thomassen (1921–2002), Norwegian actor and theatre director
Magne Thomassen (born 1941), Norwegian speed skater
Mariann Thomassen (born 1979), Norwegian musician from the rock band Surferosa
Martijn Thomassen (born 1990), Dutch football defender
Mikkjal Thomassen (born 1976), Danish field hockey player
Mogens Thomassen (1914–1987), Danish field hockey player
Petter Thomassen (1941–2003), Norwegian Conservative Party politician 
Reidar Thomassen (born 1936), Norwegian writer
Thomas Thomassen (1878–1962), Norwegian actor and theatre director
Turid Thomassen (born 1965), Norwegian Red Party politician
Wim Thomassen (1909–2001), Dutch politician

Danish-language surnames
Dutch-language surnames
Norwegian-language surnames
Patronymic surnames
Surnames from given names